Forestburg may refer to:

Canada
Forestburg, Alberta, a village
Forestburg Airport

United States
Forestburgh, New York, a town
Forestburg, South Dakota, an unincorporated town and census-designated place
Forestburg, Texas, an unincorporated community
Forestburg Independent School District
Forestburg High School